Thilde Mattison (born 19 June 1990 as Tilde Iversen) is a Danish badminton player.

Achievements

BWF International Challenge/Series 
Women's doubles

Mixed doubles

  BWF International Challenge tournament
  BWF International Series tournament
  BWF Future Series tournament

References

External links 
 

1990 births
Living people
Danish female badminton players
21st-century Danish women